This is the complete list of Commonwealth Games medallists in archery, an event that has taken place twice, at the 1982 Commonwealth Games and 2010 Commonwealth Games.

Medallists

Men's recurve individual

Men's recurve team

Men's compound individual

Men's compound team

Women's recurve individual

Women's recurve team

Women's compound individual

Women's compound team

References
Results Database from the Commonwealth Games Federation

Archery
Medalists

Commonwealth